Ruan Teixeira Silva (born January 7, 1991) is a Brazilian footballer who plays as a midfielder.

Career
Ruan started his senior career playing for Campeonato Paulista Série A3 side Cotia before playing in Greece for Alimos. In 2016, he featured in J3 League for Ryukyu, making six appearances.

References

External links

1991 births
Living people
Brazilian footballers
J3 League players
FC Ryukyu players
Brazilian expatriate footballers
Expatriate footballers in Japan
Association football midfielders
Footballers from Rio de Janeiro (city)